The Silver Trail is a 1937 American Western film directed by Bernard B. Ray.

Plot summary 
Cowboy Bob Crandall is trying to find his friend that apparently is a rich miner, with help of bandit Molly Welburn he learns the truth.

Cast 
Rex Lease as Bob Crandall
Mary Russel as Molly Welburn, aka Mary Allen
Ed Cassidy as Frank Sheridan
Roger Williams as Sam Dunn
Steve Clark as Tom (scenes deleted)
Slim Whitaker as Henchman Slug
Oscar Gahan as Henchman Curt
James Sheridan as Henchman Tex
Tom London as Looney
Rin Tin Tin, Jr. as Rinty

Soundtrack 
Goebel Leon Reeves - "I've Got a Good Job (Drifting Around)"
Goebel Leon Reeves - "Lonesome Cowboy"

External links 

1937 films
American black-and-white films
1937 Western (genre) films
American Western (genre) films
Films directed by Bernard B. Ray
Reliable Pictures films
Rin Tin Tin
Films based on works by James Oliver Curwood
1930s English-language films
1930s American films